Prevot Island is a small rocky island 0.5 nautical miles (0.9 km) northeast of Miller Island, forming the northernmost of the Wauwermans Islands, in the Wilhelm Archipelago. The name was approved by the Argentine geographic coordinating committee in 1956, replacing the provisional toponym "Fernando." Named in memory of First Lieutenant Prevot, commander of the mobile detachment in the operations of the Argentine Air Force unit for Antarctica. He died on active duty.

See also 
List of lighthouses in Antarctica
 List of Antarctic and sub-Antarctic islands

References

Islands of the Wilhelm Archipelago
Lighthouses in Antarctica